Mersey St. Mary's was an electoral ward of Trafford covering the eastern part of Ashton upon Mersey in Sale, Greater Manchester.

The ward was abolished in 2004, and its area split between the new Ashton upon Mersey and St. Mary's wards. For the ward's entire existence, it elected Conservative councillors on all but one occasion – at its creation in 1973, it elected 1 Liberal councillor alongside 2 Conservative councillors.

Its electoral history since 1973 is as follows:

References

External links
Trafford Council

Wards of Trafford
1973 establishments in England